Sir William Bowyer (c. 1588 – 1641) was an English politician who sat in the House of Commons at various times between 1620 and 1641.

Bowyer was the son of Sir John Bowyer of Knipersley Staffordshire. He became wealthy from coal and iron mines at Biddulph and Tunstall.

Bowyer was elected Member of Parliament for Staffordshire in 1621 and was re-elected for the seat in 1624 and 1626. In April 1640 he was re-elected MP for Staffordshire in the Short Parliament and again in November 1640 for the Long Parliament, but died at the beginning of 1641. 
 
Bowyer married Hester Skeffington, daughter of Sir William Skeffington of Fisherwick, Staffordshire. Their son John became an MP and baronet.

References

1580s births
1641 deaths
Year of birth uncertain
English MPs 1621–1622
English MPs 1624–1625
English MPs 1626
English MPs 1640 (April)
English MPs 1640–1648